ECWA Evangel Hospital is a 150-bed general hospital located in Jos, Plateau State, Nigeria. It was founded in 1959 by SIM (previously the Sudan Interior Mission and now known as Serving In Mission), but Evangel is now managed under the auspices of the Evangelical Church of West Africa (ECWA). Evangel is known locally in Jos as "Jankwano" meaning "Red Roof" in Hausa, as it was one of the first buildings in the area to have a corrugated iron roof.

Medical Departments
Core medical services include surgery, internal medicine, pediatrics, and obstetrics and gynecology. Over the past decade, several new, specialized areas have been added or expanded:
 Ophthalmology
 level 3 hospital
 Dentistry
 Vesicovaginal fistula (VVF) surgery
 Comprehensive HIV/AIDS care including antiretroviral drug therapy, home-based health care, and pastoral, counselling, and support  services at the Spring of Life centre
 Crisis pregnancy services
 Pastoral care
 Medical education, including
 a fully approved general practice (family practice) residency;
 general and speciality rotations for Nigerian doctors in training;
 medical electives for medical students and residents from other countries; and
 training for the Pan-African Academy of Christian Surgeons (PAACS)

History
Evangel Hospital was started in 1959 and was the vision of a SIM missionary, Dr Lonnie Grant. His proposal to SIM in 1956 was to build a hospital outside Jos to try to meet an obvious medical need in the town. SIM approved the project and the British Plateau Provincial Office subsequently permitted to build the hospital in Jos on the present site.

The out-patient clinic building was the first building built and was dedicated in February 1959. The following year, construction began on the male/female ward and the operating theatre (on the site of the present injection room). Initially, the hospital was staffed primarily by missionaries.

In 1969, the hospital was the first centre in West Africa to identify the hemorrhagic Lassa fever virus. Two missionary nurses died of the virus, and a third nurse, Penny Pinneo, fell ill and was flown to the US, where the virus was isolated and named.

In 1970, a missionary surgeon, and medical director of the hospital in Jos, Dr Jeanette Troup, died from Lassa Fever after performing an autopsy on someone who had the disease.  She accidentally cut herself during the surgery and was dead within two days.

In 1975, the Plateau State government took over the mission schools and hospitals in the state; many changes took place and most of the missionary staff were replaced by Nigerians. Two SIM doctors and two SIM nurses stayed to work under the government. After three years, the hospital was given to ECWA. The pediatric ward was added at that time.

The current maternity ward was opened in 1987, while the old maternity unit, in the private ward, was converted to an ICU and operating theatre, expanded to their present positions. The amenity ward was opened in 1992.

Dr Phil Andrew, a SIM Australian missionary, started the General practice (US: Family Physician) training program in 1982, with one resident. Since then the hospital emphasis has been in training general practitioners. All the current Nigerian consultants are graduates of this GP program.

External links
 ECWA Evangel Hospital

Hospital buildings completed in 1959
Hospitals in Nigeria
Plateau State
Hospitals established in 1959
20th-century architecture in Nigeria